Tren de la Costa is a planned regional rail line in Peru, paralleling the Pan American Highway between the cities of Sullana and Ica, via Lima. The line is estimated to cost $10 billion, and is expected to carry 57 million passengers per year.

Project
In October 2012, Congress declared the line a national priority and invited invitations to tender for the financing, construction, operation and maintenance of the line. Little progress was made until a 2019 announcement from the Peruvian government declaring its intention to fund the line as a public private partnership.

Route
The original plan for a  line consisted of eleven trains per day serving the communities of Lima, Ica, Áncash, La Libertad, Lambayeque and Piura, totalling the most populous area of Peru. The first stage of construction will be from Huaco to Ica via Lima, with a commuter rail service planned on the line for the Lima metropolitan area. This section was planned to commence construction in 2019,
 but a 2020 construction start is now planned on the  Lima to Ica section. The rail line will provide a three-hour travel time between Lima and Ica, and cost $3.2 billion.

See also
Rail transport in Peru

References

Rail transport in Peru
Transport in Peru
Railway companies of Peru